Liopterus is a genus of beetles in the family Dytiscidae, containing the following species:

 Liopterus atriceps (Sharp, 1882)
 Liopterus haemorrhoidalis (Fabricius, 1787)

References

Dytiscidae genera